Paddy Flynn (born 11 December 1987) is a former professional rugby league footballer who played as a er. He played for the Widnes Vikings, and on loan from Widnes at the Castleford Tigers (Heritage № 970) in the Super League. Flynn also played for the Sheffield Eagles and the Rochdale Hornets in the Championship.

Flynn has appeared Outside of sport, Flynn also works part-time as a plumber. His hobbies include playing Clash of Clans, where he represents Yorkshire based CGDL.

Background
Flynn was born in St Helens, Merseyside, England.

Club career
Paddy Flynn made his début for Widnes, scoring two tries against Barrow at Craven Park on Sunday 16 March 2008. Flynn scored his 100th Widnes try against the Wakefield Trinity Wildcats on 12 September 2015

In May 2016 Paddy joined the Castleford Tigers on loan for the rest of the 2016 season.

Paddy left the Widnes Vikings in 2016 and is currently playing for Rochdale Hornets. in the Betfred Championship

At the beginning of May 2017 Kingstone Press Championship side the Sheffield Eagles signed Flynn until the end of the season. He scored a try on his first appearance in the Championship for the Eagles in a 45-20 defeat at the hands of French side Toulouse Olympique.

References

External links

Widnes Vikings profile
Search for "Paddy Flynn" AND "Rugby League" at BBC → Sport
Statistics at rugby.widnes.tv

1987 births
Living people
Castleford Tigers players
English rugby league players
Rochdale Hornets players
Rugby league fullbacks
Rugby league players from St Helens, Merseyside
Rugby league wingers
Sheffield Eagles players
Widnes Vikings players